Zion Methodist Church, Wilberforce Street is a historic Settler church established by the Nova Scotian Settlers in 1792 and the present building was constructed in the early to middle of the nineteenth century.

History
Zion Methodist Church, Wilberforce Street is a historical Methodist church based in Freetown, Sierra Leone which was founded by the original African American founders of the Colony of Sierra Leone.

Sources
Fyfe, Christopher, A History of Sierra Leone, (Britain: Oxford University, 1962). 

Churches in Freetown
Nova Scotian Settler (Sierra Leone)
Methodist churches in Sierra Leone